Bad Hair is a 2020 American satirical comedy horror film written, directed, and produced by Justin Simien. The film stars Elle Lorraine, Jay Pharoah, Lena Waithe, Kelly Rowland, Laverne Cox, Chanté Adams, James Van Der Beek, Usher Raymond IV, Blair Underwood, and Vanessa Williams.

Bad Hair had its world premiere at the Sundance Film Festival on January 23, 2020. It was released in a limited release on October 16, 2020, by Neon, followed by digital streaming on Hulu on October 23, 2020. The film received moderately positive reviews from critics.

Plot
In the late 1970s, a young Anna attempts to relax her hair with the help of her older cousin Linda. Her hair has a bad reaction to the cream and leaves a permanent scar at the back of her head.

Many years later, in 1989, an adult Anna is an assistant at Culture, a television station featuring African-American music artists. Aspiring to move up in the industry, she is devastated when her mentor, Edna, the current head of programming, is ousted by the station's owner, Grant Madison, and replaced with former supermodel Zora. Anna suggests her idea to expand the station's reach by diversifying the Culture VJs' style and showcase a live music video countdown show. Impressed, Zora takes her on as her assistant, but demands that Anna change from her natural Afro-textured hair to a weave to fit the station's new image. Zora gives her the address of her upscale hair salon, Virgie's. The process is painful, but Virgie gives Anna a pink bottle of hair product and tells her never to let the weave get wet.

Anna's new hair helps her succeed, getting her noticed by an old work flame, Julius. She expresses the desire to become host of the countdown. Despite the VJs' reluctance to change to a more commercial appearance, Anna convinces them to sport the new weaves. However, she begins to notice strange phenomena, such as the hair moving on its own, intense hunger pangs, and dreams of hair being cut on a plantation. When her drunk landlord, Mr. Tannen, attempts to rape her, Anna stabs him in self defense. The hair surges into the wound and drains Tannen of his blood, killing him. She is horrified. At a party, Zora asks cryptic questions about whether Anna is still using the hair product, leading her to suspect that Zora is similarly afflicted. She is confronted by Edna, who is disappointed by Anna selling out Culture's image and criticizes her weave as indicative of her lack of integrity. Anna is crushed when she learns that Zora has made herself host instead, and has been having an affair with Julius. When Anna later has sex with Julius, the hair possesses her, and she angrily stabs him. The hair feeds on his blood.

Terrified, Anna flees to a natural hair salon to have the weave removed and runs into Edna. She tearfully apologizes for disappointing her, but as the stylist attempts to cut her weave out, the hair kills everyone in the salon. Anna recalls an African American slave lore tale called "The Moss Haired Girl" from a book given to her by her uncle, a Black studies professor. A slave fashions a wig from tree moss to replicate the straight hair of her masters, but finds the moss is actually the hair of dead witches who possess the woman. Frantic, Anna finds that Zora and others who received weaves from Virgie's are possessed. Zora attempts to break free from the possession and is killed by her own hair. Now fully controlling Zora and the others, the hair chases  Anna through the building. Trapped in a sound booth, she lights a cigarette in preparation for her death. However, she spots a sprinkler and triggers it, causing water to soak her and the others, weakening her hair and allowing her to cut it off.

As she moves back into her uncle and aunt's home, Anna learns the hair product is made with pig's blood, intended to help feed the hair. She sees new advertisements for Culture featuring Zora, who survived and is now fully possessed by the witches' hair. She finishes reading the story of the Moss Haired Girl, which tells of the plantation master's descendants continuing to farm the hair, knowing of its controlling abilities. A truck with the same logo of the tree moss illustration drives out to a plantation, where it loads up boxes of hair, and unloads the corpses of the hair's victims. The plantation owner is revealed to be Culture station owner, Grant Madison, and the tree, rife with writhing hair, grows nearby. Anna's cousin Linda announces she managed to get an appointment at Virgie's to have a weave put in.

Cast

Production
In August 2017, it was announced Justin Simien would direct, write, and produce the film, with Oren Moverman serving as an executive producer under his Sight Unseen banner.

Release
It had its world premiere at the Sundance Film Festival on January 23, 2020. Shortly after, Hulu acquired distribution rights to the film. It was released in a limited release on October 16, 2020, by Neon, followed by digital streaming on October 23, 2020.

Reception
The website's critics consensus reads: "Bad Hairs unwieldy ambitions are easy to respect – even if the film's tonal jumble and uneven execution are impossible to ignore." On Metacritic, the film has a weighted average score of 61 out of 100 based on 23 critics, indicating "generally favorable reviews".

References

External links
 

2020 films
2020 comedy horror films
2020 independent films
2020s satirical films
2020 black comedy films
African-American comedy horror films
Films scored by Kris Bowers
Hulu original films
2020s English-language films
2020s American films